Portevinia is a genus of hoverflies. There is only one European species - P. maculata.

Species
P. altaica (Stackelberg, 1926)
P. dispar (Hervé-Bazin, 1929)
P. maculata (Fallén, 1817)

References

Diptera of Europe
Eristalinae
Hoverfly genera